Keith Seabrook (born August 2, 1988) is a Canadian former professional ice hockey player. He played four seasons in the AHL for the Abbotsford Heat, Manitoba Moose and San Antonio Rampage and the Rockford IceHogs and one season in Italy's Serie A for the HC Pustertal Wölfe before taking a time-out from hockey midway through the 2012–13 season.

Playing career 
Seabrook played junior hockey for the Coquitlam/Burnaby Express in the BCHL from 2004–2006.

In 2006, Seabrook was selected by the Washington Capitals in the second round (52nd overall) of the 2006 NHL Entry Draft. Seabrook then played one season for the University of Denver, before joining the WHL Calgary Hitmen major junior hockey team for two seasons. On July 16, 2009, the Washington Capitals traded Seabrook to the Calgary Flames for future considerations. Seabrook then became a professional player with the Flames' AHL affiliate Abbotsford Heat for the 2009–10 AHL season. Seabrook remained with the Heat in the 2010–11 season until March 4, 2011, when the Heat loaned him to the Manitoba Moose, while centre MacGregor Sharp was loaned from the Moose to the Heat. On July 9, 2011, the Calgary Flames traded Seabrook to the Florida Panthers for Jordan Henry.

In September 2012, Seabrook signed his first European contract with the HC Val Pusteria Wolves in Italian Serie A for the 2012–13 season. After an initial slow start with the Wolves, Seabrook showed his acumen in contributing with 8 goals and 18 points in 18 games, before seeking a release from his contract to return home in Canada for a self-imposed time-out from hockey on November 18, 2012.

On August 22, 2014, Seabrook signalled his comeback to professional hockey in signing a one-year AHL contract with the Bridgeport Sound Tigers. He was assigned to ECHL affiliate, the Stockton Thunder to begin the 2014–15 season. Seabrook contributed with 27 points in 50 games before his AHL rights were traded by the Sound Tigers to the Rockford IceHogs, an affiliate of the Chicago Blackhawks, on March 4, 2015. Seabrook was immediately recalled from the Thunder and remained with the IceHogs for the duration of the playoffs.

Personal 
Seabrook's older brother, Brent played for the Chicago Blackhawks of the NHL.

Career statistics

References

External links

1988 births
Living people
Abbotsford Heat players
Burnaby Express players
Calgary Hitmen players
Canadian ice hockey defencemen
Cincinnati Cyclones (ECHL) players
Coquitlam Express players
Denver Pioneers men's ice hockey players
HC Pustertal Wölfe players
Ice hockey people from British Columbia
Manitoba Moose players
People from Delta, British Columbia
Rockford IceHogs (AHL) players
San Antonio Rampage players
Stockton Thunder players
Washington Capitals draft picks
Canadian expatriate ice hockey players in Italy